Bryan McBride (born December 10, 1991 in Long Beach, California) is an American track and field athlete who competes primarily in the high jump. McBride has coached long Jump, triple Jump and high Jump at Cuyamaca College since 2016. His exuberant celebration, running halfway down the football field in Hornet Stadium after the winning jump was captured on NBC's television coverage. He was also runner-up at the 2016 Indoor Championships.

Professional
Bryan McBride placed 8th after clearing  at 2017 World Championships in Athletics – Men's high jump.

Arizona State University
McBride is the 2014 NCAA Outdoor High Jump Champion, earned 8 NCAA Division I All America honors, 2015 Pac-12 High Jump Champion, 2015 MPSF High Jump Champion, and 2015 MPSF Long Jump Champion.

McBride had previously jumped 2.30 while competing for Arizona State, breaking the 38-year-old school record of Kyle Arney from 1977.  He became the 2014 NCAA Champion.

He lost the 2013 season to a stress fracture of his left ankle.  He is also a credible long jumper, having jumped , indoors in Seattle while at Arizona State.

Prep

McBride won 2010 Arizona Interscholastic Association High Jump 5A Division 2 state title after clearing  and 2009 AIA 4A Division 1 state title clearing  at Mesa Community College.

McBride grew up in Peoria, Arizona as an Outfielder.

References

External links
 
 

1991 births
Living people
World Athletics Championships athletes for the United States
American male high jumpers
African-American male track and field athletes
Arizona State Sun Devils men's track and field athletes
Track and field athletes from Long Beach, California
Sportspeople from Arizona
Athletics (track and field) coaches
USA Outdoor Track and Field Championships winners
21st-century African-American sportspeople